The Battle of Cotton Plant (July 7, 1862) saw a 10,000-strong Union Army commanded by Samuel Ryan Curtis encounter a 5,000-man Confederate force led by Albert Rust. A Union advance guard commanded by Charles Edward Hovey did most of the fighting, repelling an attack by two Texas cavalry regiments led by William Henry Parsons. Union reinforcements under William P. Benton arrived and pressed the Texas cavalry and Arkansas infantry into a disorderly retreat. Curtis's army subsequently occupied Helena. Earlier in the campaign, Texas cavalry inflicted 49 casualties on a Union foraging party in the Battle of Whitney's Lane near Searcy on May 19, 1862. At the Battle of L'Anguille Ferry near Marianna on August 3, 1862 the Texas cavalry overran a Union wagon convoy.

The following Union Army units and commanders served in the campaign.

Abbreviations used
 MG = Major General
 BG = Brigadier General
 Col = Colonel
 Hovey = Col Charles E. Hovey's brigade

Army of the Southwest

Army Commander
MG Samuel Ryan Curtis

Notes
Footnotes

Citations

References

 

American Civil War orders of battle
Arkansas in the American Civil War